The 2013 NCAA Division II Football Championship Game was a postseason college football game that determined a national champion in NCAA Division II for the 2013 season. It was played at Braly Municipal Stadium in Florence, Alabama, on December 21, 2013, with kickoff at noon EST (11:00 a.m. local CST), and television coverage on ESPN2.

Teams
The participants of the 2013 NCAA Division II Football Championship Game were the finalists of the 2013 Division II Playoffs, which began with teams seeded 3–6 in each super region playing in the first round, the winners of which faced teams seeded 1–2 in the second round. From there, the bracket was a sixteen-team single-elimination tournament. The game featured the No. 1 seed Lenoir–Rhyne Bears and the No. 1 seed Northwest Missouri State Bearcats. This was the eighth championship game appearance for the Bearcats and the first championship game appearance for the Bears.

National semifinals

Game summary

Statistics

References

Championship Game
NCAA Division II Football Championship Games
Lenoir–Rhyne Bears football games
Northwest Missouri State Bearcats football games
American football competitions in Alabama
NCAA Division II Football Championship Game
NCAA Division II Football Championship Game
Florence, Alabama